Asa is a given name in several parts of the world.

 Asa (אסא): derived from the Hebrew language, as the name appears in the Old Testament to designate the third King of Judah, who reigned for forty years. It became a popular American name because of the influence of the Puritans in the 17th century.
 Asa: a Hebrew name meaning healer and/or physician (Ase).
 Åsa (pronounced "o-sa"): a Swedish name related to one of the most ancient Norse names, referencing Æsir, which means "goddess".
 Asa (pronounced "asha"): a Yoruba language word which means or refers to the 'hawk' bird.
 Asa (pronounced "aa-saa"): an Igbo Nigerian name with the  meaning "Beautiful”
 Asa (朝 or あさ): Japanese name meaning "morning".
 Asa: Indonesian for "Hope". 
 Asa: Portuguese means "Wing".
 Asa: [Malagasy] (native tongue of Madagascar) means "Work."
 Asha : Nepali means "Hope"
 Asa: Punjabi means “Hope”
 Asa: Filipino means “Hope”.

People
 Asa Andrew (born 1971), American doctor and radio host
 Asa Baber (1936–2003), American author and Playboy columnist
 Asa Biggs (1811–1878), American politician
 Asa Briggs (1921–2016), British historian
 Asa S. Bushnell (governor) (1834–1904), American politician, 40th Governor of Ohio
 Asa Butterfield (born 1997), British actor
 Asa Earl Carter (1925–1979), American segregationist, Ku Klux Klan leader and Western novelist
 Asa Coon (1993-2007), perpetrator of the 2007 SuccessTech Academy shooting
 Asa Griggs Candler (1851–1929), founder of the Coca-Cola company
 Asa Danforth (1746–1818), early settler in Onondaga County, New York
 Asa Gray (1810–1888), American botanist
 Asa Hall (born 1986), English footballer
 Asa Hartford (born 1950), Scottish football player and coach
 Asa Grant Hilliard III (1933–2007), African-American professor of educational psychology
 Asa Hutchinson (born 1950), American politician and lawyer
 Asa Jackson (born 1989), American football player
 Asa Jennings (1877–1933), American Methodist pastor who evacuated 350,000 Greeks and others from Turkey
 Asa Kasher (born 1940), Israeli philosopher and linguist
 Asa Keisar (born 1973), Israeli Jewish advocate for veganism
 Asa Lanova (1933–2017), Swiss dancer and author
 Asa Lovejoy (1808–1882), American businessman and politician
 Asa Mader (born 1975), American film director, screenwriter and visual artist
 Asa C. Matthews (1833–1908), American lawyer, judge and politician
Asa Messer (1769–1836), American Baptist clergyman and educator; President of Brown University from 1804 to 1826
 Asa Packer (1805–1879), American businessman and politician
A. Philip Randolph (1889–1979), African-American leader of the Civil Rights Movement and founder of the first black labor union in the U.S.
 Asa Robinson, rugby league footballer
 Asa Taccone (born 1983), lead singer of indie rock band Electric Guest
 Asa Wentworth Tenney (1833–1897), US federal judge
 Asa Wentworth Jr. (1797-1882), American businessman and politician
 Asa Whitney (1797–1874), American merchant and transcontinental railroad promoter
 Asa Yoelson (1886–1950), birth name of Al Jolson, singer and actor

Biblical reference
 Asa of Judah, third king of Judah, son of Abijam, grandson of Rehoboam

Fictional characters

 Asa the Black Monk, a character in The Devil and Daniel Webster
 Asa Buchanan, in the American soap opera One Life to Live
 Asa Griffiths, in the novel An American Tragedy by Theodore Dreiser
 Asa Hawks, in the novel Wise Blood by Flannery O'Connor and the film of the same name.
 Asa Heshel, in the novel The Family Moskat.
 Asa "Asey" Mayo, in the mystery novel series by Phoebe Atwood Taylor
 Asa Mitaka, in the Chainsaw Man manga series
 Asa Phelps, in The Simpsons episode "Raging Abe Simpson and His Grumbling Grandson in 'The Curse of the Flying Hellfish'
 Asa Pike, in the young adult novel series, Charlie Bone
 Asa Shigure, in the Shuffle! media franchise

See also
 Åsa (disambiguation)
Aza (disambiguation)